Just Right is a breakfast cereal produced by Kellogg's. It was created in the 1980s for health-conscious, athletic Australians, who are the world's third-biggest cereal eaters. The cereal is sold in the United Kingdom, Iceland, Ireland, New Zealand and Australia but has been discontinued in other markets. A similarly named cereal with different ingredients (also manufactured by Kellogg's) was available in Canada from 1985-2021.

Just Right is composed of whole wheat, corn, and rice flakes, with raisins (sultanas in Australia), date nuggets and sliced almonds. It is also labelled as vitamin-fortified and low-fat. 

An early commercial for the cereal when sold in the United States has become an internet viral video due to it featuring a then-unknown Tori Amos.

Nutritional information
Just Right received four stars out of five on the Australian Government's health star ratings.

The following information was taken from a Kellogg's Just Right cereal box in July 2007, with a box top date of SEP 20 2007 (KCB 014).

Pop culture
 Tori Amos was featured in a 1980s commercial promoting the brand.

References

External links
 

Almond dishes
Kellogg's cereals